The MerredinLink is a rural passenger train service in Western Australia operated by Transwa between East Perth and Merredin.

History
The MerredinLink was introduced in June 2004 when the AvonLink from East Perth was extended from Northam to Merredin on three days a week.

In August 2013, Transwa announced that the MerredinLink would cease with The Prospector to make additional stops. However in December 2013 the service was given a reprieve.

In May 2014, it was announced that the service would continue until at least June 2017. To release rolling stock for an enhanced AvonLink service, in December 2014 the MerredinLink was reduced to a Wednesdays only service. From July 2017 it resumed operating three times a week. As at June 2022, it operates on Mondays, Wednesdays and Fridays.

Rolling stock
The MerredinLink is operated by a two-carriage WEA/WEB railcar.

Ridership
The MerredinLink had 6,039 passengers in the year leading up to June 2022.

See also
 Australind (train service)

References

External links

Named passenger trains of Western Australia
Railway services introduced in 2004
Wheatbelt (Western Australia)
2004 establishments in Australia
Merredin, Western Australia